Eran Raven is a mentalist and security expert.

Raven is best known in technology circles by his birth name, Eran Feigenbaum, for his role as both the former director of security at Google Enterprise (2007-2016), and the former chief information security officer for Jet.com.

Raven is famous in the US for his death-defying mentalism performances on NBC’s Phenomenon.

Early life
Eran Raven was born Eran Feigenbaum in Tel Aviv, Israel. His mother was a high school principal and his father was a rocket scientist.

His interest in magic began at an early age, and he gave his first public performance at age 11. He became interested in mentalism after he realized the way he asked questions could influence the person's response, or willingness to respond, to the request. Raven became fascinated by, and would make much use of, this nonverbal communication.

Appearances
Raven has appeared on stage in more than 35 countries in North America, Europe and Asia; and on more than 50 TV shows internationally. His biggest air date was on NBC's Phenomenon, before a broadcast audience of 8 million live viewers.

In October and November 2007, Raven was one of ten mentalist contestants on the primetime NBC series Phenomenon, which was hosted by Tim Vincent and judged by Criss Angel and Uri Geller.  He finished as runner-up on the series, after performing dangerous demonstrations of mentalism involving razor blades, snakes, scorpions, and nail guns.

A demonstration with Holly Madison went wrong when Raven was bitten by a snake on live TV. He decided to continue after having his hand bandaged.

Raven was seriously injured during rehearsals for another demonstration, which resulted in multiple ruptured disks in his back and relegated him to using a wheelchair, and a cane for a period thereafter.  He has commented that he will reattempt this demonstration 

Famous personalities Raven has "manipulated" include Arnold Schwarzenegger, Bruce Willis, Owen Wilson and Sylvester Stallone.

Security career
As Eran Feigenbaum, he worked at Google  as head of security for Google Enterprise, and gave multiple presentations before technical audiences the world over, and members of Congress.  He has written security whitepapers with ex-Google CIO Douglas Merrill.

Eran Feigenbaum is a frequent speaker at international security gatherings like Black Hat Security Conference and Hacker Halted, where he talks about why current security systems don't work, the vulnerability of passwords and how to think like a hacker. His areas of expertise include cybersecurity, perception management, social engineering and non-verbal cues.

He is currently Chief Security Officer at Oracle. He sits on the board of a number of technology startups, including telemedicine innovator Curogram; technology company Peri; and KoolSpan, an encrypted mobile communications provider.

Personal life
Raven has been linked to Heather Sweet (AKA Dita Von Teese) when they went to University High School together, and TV personality Carmen Electra whom he met during his nail gun stunt on NBC's Phenomenon.

References

External links
Official Website
Official Myspace

LinkedIn

1974 births
Living people
Mentalists
People from Highland Park, New Jersey
People from Irvine, California